Martina Hingis defeated Lindsay Davenport in the final, 7–5, 6–4, 4–6, 6–2 to win the singles tennis title at the 1998 Chase Championships.

Jana Novotná was the defending champion, but lost in the first round to Steffi Graf.

This marked the last WTA Championships final to be best-of-five-sets.

Seeds
A champion seed is indicated in bold text while text in italics indicates the round in which that seed was eliminated.

  Lindsay Davenport (final)
  Martina Hingis (champion)
  Jana Novotná (first round)
  Arantxa Sánchez-Vicario (first round)
  Monica Seles (quarterfinals)
  Mary Pierce (quarterfinals)
  Conchita Martínez (first round)
  Nathalie Tauziat (quarterfinals)

Draw

 NB: The Final was best of 5 sets while all other rounds were best of 3 sets.

External links
 1998 Chase Championships Draw

Singles 1998
Singles